John Tarleton is the name of:

John Tarleton (slave trader) (1718–1773), English ship-owner and slave-trader, Mayor of Liverpool in 1764, father of John Tarleton (MP)
John Tarleton (MP) (1755–1841), English ship-owner, slave-trader and politician, son of John Tarleton (slave trader)
John Tarleton (Royal Navy officer) (1811–1880), admiral and Second Sea Lord
John Tarleton (American settler) (ca. 1808–1895), American rancher best known for endowing what became Tarleton State University
John Tarleton (cricketer) (1852-1929), New Zealand cricketer

See also